Irvine Valley may refer to:

Irvine Valley College, California, United States
Loudoun, a parish in East Ayrshire, Scotland, roughly encompassing the northern half of the Upper-Irvine Valley along the River Irvine